The Buenos Aires–Rosario–Córdoba high-speed railway (Spanish: Tren de Alta Velocidad de Argentina – TAVe) was a project designed to link the Argentine cities of Buenos Aires, Rosario and Córdoba through a  high-speed rail network.
The entire project was dismissed due to the financial crisis of 2007–08.

Overview 

Buenos Aires and its metropolitan area has a population of more than 13 million, almost one third of the national total. It is the economic and political center of Argentina, and its main international entry point.

It is part of the agricultural and industrial core of the littoral region.

It is the second most populated metropolitan area, and a cultural, touristic, and industrial center.

Altogether, the three cities include 15 million inhabitants, or more than a third of the country's overall population of 40 million, while representing the three major cities. Rosario and Cordoba are vital centers in the farm sector, which has grown rapidly in recent years thanks to high commodity prices.

By the moment the project was announced in 2006, the main form of transportation between these three cities was by road, through National Route 9 (4 lane Highway from Buenos Aires to Rosario and 2 lane route from Rosario to Cordoba -Rosario to Cordoba highway is expected to be finished by 2009-), followed far behind by air travel. The high speed rail would act as an essential component in the revival of railways in Argentina, which would have major impact on the economic development of the region for both faster passenger and cargo connections.

Features 
Alstom was the company chosen to provide eight 509-passenger double-deck TGVs equipped with ETCS Level 2 signalling. The new line should have provided a Buenos Aires—Rosario journey time of 85 minutes (for comparison, an intercity passenger bus takes about four hours), with Córdoba reached 90 minutes later.

Stations 
The new train would link the cities along the central corridor through the agricultural heartland of Argentina. According to the current plan, there will be 20 train services daily, carrying about 7,500 passengers. Several intermediate stops are planned between the main ones, most likely in the cities of Pilar, Campana, San Pedro, San Nicolás de los Arroyos, Cañada de Gómez, Marcos Juárez, Bell Ville and Villa María.

Bids, costs and financing 
The total cost of the Buenos Aires—Rosario—Córdoba line was calculated at US$ 4 billion. Four European firms presented themselves as bidders: Alstom (French), Siemens (German), CAF (Spanish) and Impregilo (Italian). Pre-contractual conditions stated that the national state will pay for the whole sum, but the firm in charge of the construction will finance 50%. When technical and financial bids were due in March 2007 only the Veloxia grouping of Alstom, Isolux Corsan, Iecsa and Emepa Group came forward, and the consortium was selected as preferred bidder on 20 June 2007.

Veloxia was formally selected on 16 January 2008, with a contract to be signed 'in the next few months'. Alstom would supply eight double-deck TGV trains called 'Cobra'. while IECSA would undertake civil engineering, Isolux Corsan and Emepa Group would construct the track.

The Argentine state secretary of transport, Ricardo Jaime, announced on 27 March 2008 that the finance minister Martín Lousteau and the consortium led by the French company Alstom approved a resolution to finance the Buenos Aires—Rosario—Cordoba High Speed Train (TAVe). The credit line was provided by the French bank Natixis, covering 100% of the project. The financing scheme anticipates an investment of approximately A$ 12,500 million (€2 billion or US$4 billion), to be financed with a long-term credit of 30 years that would be guaranteed with the delivery of the public titles.

The project was finally dismissed in December 2012. French company Alstom, that had been won the tender to build high-speed rail, admitted to have paid bribes to the Argentine authorities.

Timeline 
 8 May 2006: Licitation call (offerers qualification): Impregilo, Siemens, Alstom and CAF.
 25 July 2006: Companies qualification act: Siemens, Alstom and CAF.
 20 December 2006: Technical offers. Delayed two times until 27 March 2007: Only Alstom.
 30 January 2007: Economic offers. Delayed two times until 30 April 2007.
 16 January 2008: Argentina chooses Alstom-led consortium in partnership with Spanish and Argentine companies to build the first very high speed line in the Americas.
 27 March 2008: Approval of a resolution for External financing.
 29 April 2008: President Cristina Fernández de Kirchner formally signed a turnkey contract with the Veloxia consortium for the construction of a 320 km/h line between Buenos Aires, Rosario and Córdoba.
 7 February 2009: Alstom CEO announces entire project "on stand-by" due to the current financial crisis. Expresses optimism project will be completed in the future.
 December 2012: Minister of Transport, Florencio Randazzo, stated that "a train running to Rosario on a secure road, with a journey time of 3 hours and a half, would be enough for me", implicitly dismissing the project.

The Mar del Plata connection 

It would only have stops in Dolores and Chascomús and complete the journey to Mar del Plata in less than two hours. Today, the service is disrupted by serious deficiencies and delays and takes over seven hours, more than the service provided in the '50s by El Marplatense with speeds of up to 90+ mph (150 km/h) making the run in 3 hrs 45 min in then cutting edge Budd Co.-built formations.

Criticism
The project was heavily criticised by Poder Ciudadano, the Argentine dependency of the worldwide anti-corruption NGO Transparency International, for being disproportionately expensive relative to the number of people benefitting from it. Poder Ciudadano also expressed its disapproval at the Argentine government's diversion of funds away from the already under-funded Buenos Aires metropolitan rail-service, which is used every day by millions of citizens.
. Later, when Poder Ciudadano asked for the expedient of the bidding, it was rejected in two occasions.

See also 
 Rail transport in Argentina
 Transportation in Argentina
 Patio Parada
 Planned high-speed rail by country

References

External links
 
 
 
 
 
 
 
 
 
 
 
 

Presidency of Néstor Kirchner
h
h
h
High-speed rail in Argentina
Proposed railway lines in Argentina
High-speed railway lines in Argentina